Deodato 2 is a 1973 album by Brazilian keyboardist Eumir Deodato. It features noted session guitarist John Tropea on 4 tracks and virtuoso bassist Stanley Clarke on one song, "Skyscrapers". His version of George Gershwin's "Rhapsody in Blue" was used in Pontiac commercials during the early-1970s. The song reached #48 in Canada in 1973.

The songs "Super Strut" and "Latin Flute" were featured on the soundtrack of the video game Grand Theft Auto Vice City. The track "Super Strut" was also covered by the acid jazz band The Apostles on their 1992 eponymous album.

Track listing

Vinyl

Side 1
 "Nights in White Satin" (Justin Hayward) - 6:01
 "Pavane for a Dead Princess" (Maurice Ravel) 4:08
 "Skyscrapers" (Eumir Deodato) - 6:40

Side 2
 "Super Strut" (Eumir Deodato) - 8:58
 "Rhapsody in Blue" (George Gershwin, arrangement and adaptation by Eumir Deodato) - 8:48

CD
The tracks were rearranged for the CD release. The two tracks on Side 2 were placed first then the tracks on Side 1 were placed after. The CD release also featured an extended version of Super Strut, an extended and re-mixed outro to Skyscrapers, as well as 3 bonus tracks.
 "Super Strut" - 9:31
 "Rhapsody in Blue" - 8:48
 "Nights in White Satin" - 6:01
 "Pavane for a Dead Princess" - 4:08
 "Skyscrapers" - 7:01

Bonus tracks
 "Latin Flute" (Eumir Deodato) - 4:49
 "Venus" (Eumir Deodato) - 3:32
 "Do It Again" (Walter Becker, Donald Fagen) - 5:31

"Tropea" (incomplete, not released on this album) was produced during the recording sessions of Deodato 2.

Charts

Personnel
Source:

Band
Eumir Deodato: Keyboards, Acoustic and Electric Piano
John Tropea: Guitars
John Giulino, Stanley Clarke: Bass
Alvin Brehm, Russell Savakus: Arco Bass
Billy Cobham, Rick Marotta, Frank Zee: Drums
Gilmore Degap, Rubens Bassini: Congas, Percussion

Strings
David Nadien, Elliot Rosoff, Emanuel Green, Gene Orloff, Harold Kohon, Harry Cykman, Harry Glickman, Harry Lookofsky, Irving Spice, Joe Malin, Max Ellen, Paul Gershman: Violin
Alfred Brown, Emanuel Vardi: Viola
Alan Shulman, Charles McCracken, George Ricci: Cello

Woodwinds
Joe Temperley: Baritone Sax
George Marge, Hubert Laws, Jerry Dodgion, Romeo Penque: Flute
Tony Studd: Bass Trombone
Garnett Brown, Wayne Andre: Trombone
Brooks Tillotson, Jim Buffington: French Horn
Alan Rubin, Marvin Stamm, Jon Faddis: Flugelhorn and Trumpet
Burt Collins, Joe Shepley, Victor Paz: Trumpet

Later releases
This album was reissued on the Super Audio CD format in October 2017 by UK label Dutton Vocalion,
Remastered in both Stereo and Surround Sound from the original analogue tapes by Michael J. Dutton and released as a 2-fer with 1973's "Prelude".
The Surround Sound portion of the disc features the Quadraphonic mixes of both "Prelude" and "Deodato 2" made available for the first time in over 40 years.

Sources
 Didier Deutch, Deodato 2 sleeve text

References

1973 albums
Eumir Deodato albums
Albums arranged by Eumir Deodato
Albums produced by Creed Taylor
Albums recorded at Van Gelder Studio
CTI Records albums